Strokes of Life is a costume Hokkien drama set in 1917, then 1940. It was produced by Formosa Television in Taiwan and was broadcast in 2001. It starred Ye Huan, Lin Wei, Wang Mei Jun and Chen Guang.

Plot

Season 1
Two brides, Yu Ye (Ye Huan) and Jin Feng (Mei Jun) met each other while on their way to their future husband. According to the costume, two brides meeting each other on their wedding day will bring bad luck. Thus, Yu Ye and Jin Feng wish each other a good marriage ahead. When Yu Ye reached her husband's house, Jin Feng was there also. Meanwhile, Shi Hua (Lin Wei) had no idea that he will have a double wedding that day.

Season 2
Season 2 remarks the appearance of Qiong Mei (played by Ye Huan), Yu Ye's twin sister. She came to Taiwan as a Japanese woman with her fiancée, Zheng Chuan. It was discovered that she had lost her memory when Zheng Guang attacked Yong Hui.

Season 3
Season 3 remarks the aftermath of Qiong Mei's suicide and the rising Of Wang Ying Tai.

Season 4
23 years later, in 1940. Jin Feng is mentally unstable. She hates Ming Feng (her son with Ying Tai) but focused all her motherly love to Jia Sheng.

Cast

Main characters

Original

Secondary characters

Reprising characters

New generation characters
Appeared in Season 4

Tertiary characters

Special characters
Appeared in Season 2

Theme songs

Opening theme
Also used as post-commercial eye catch throughout the series 
Song: "Jin Zhi Yu Ye"  
Singers: Ye Huan, Lin Wei, Wang Mei Jun, Chen Guang
Language: Hokkien
Trivia: 
Voices appearances
Verse 1
Part 1-2: Ye Huan
Line 3-4: Lin Wei
Line 5-6: Wang Mei Jun
Line 7-8: Chen Guang
Chorus
Parts 1 & 2: Ye Huan & Mei Jun
Parts 3 & 4: Lin Wei & Chen Guang
Parts 5: Ye Huan & Mei Jun
Parts 6: Lin Wei & Chen Guang
Verse 2
Line 1-2: Ye Huan
Line 3-4: Chen Guang

Ending theme (Season 1)
Also used as pre-commercial eye catch throughout the series
Song: "Generation of Beautiful Woman"
Singer: Ye Huan
Language: Mandarin

Ending theme (Seasons 2 - 4)
Song: "Lie"
Singer: Ye Huan
Language: Hokkien

References

Taiwanese television series
Hokkien-language television shows